Bet Shira Congregation is a Conservative synagogue located at 7500 SW 120th Street in Miami, Florida.

History
In February 1985, a nucleus of families left Congregation Beth David to form a new congregation, Bet Shira. The membership grew to 300 families in the weeks that followed. The name "Bet Shira" (House of Song) was selected to reflect the upbeat and dynamic character of the founders. In May 1988, the Letty Roth Synagogue Complex was dedicated as was the Arin Stacey Appplebaum Sanctuary.

In January 1990, Mark Kula, a graduate of the Cantor Institute of the Jewish Theological Seminary in New York City, became Bet Shira's new cantor.  In August 1992, Hurricane Andrew badly damaged the synagogue.

In 2005, the synagogue was serving 500 families.  That year, Sam Rosen of Bet Shira Congregation was chosen as co-winner of the Jewish community's Teacher of the Year, Excellence in Teaching Award by the Center for the Advancement of Jewish Education.  In 2007, the synagogue acquired a Torah scroll that during World War II had been smuggled out of the Polish town of Tarnów, when it was invaded by Nazis and its Jewish population destroyed, and protected by monks in a monastery near Kiev until the Soviet Union collapsed.

Community programs
Bet Shira holds an annual "Mitzvah day" every year, where volunteers, and members engage in activities such as: Beautification of community sites, planting trees at homes of the disabled and elderly as part of a "Treemendous Miami" project; blood drives; and many clothing, food, toy and medical supply drives to benefit the Miami community.

The synagogue's Early Childhood Center was also a site of "Project Kavod", a three-year pilot program in improving the culture of employment in early childhood, by the Coalition for the Advancement of Jewish Education, which was launched in 2004.

Drive-through sukkah
For the holiday of Sukkot, Bet Shira erects what is believed to be the first and only drive-through Sukkah, a tent in the parking lot of the synagogue that it calls the "McBet Shira Sukkah", allowing the community to participate in the celebration of the holiday from the convenience of their cars. Members of the public can drive into the sukkah, park, lower their car window, and say the blessings for the holiday, including shaking a lulav and an etrog, as volunteers hand them snacks at the end of their visit.  The idea, put into effect first in 2009, is credited to Cantor Mark Kula, who noted that cars are "integral" to people's lifestyles. He explained that “We sit as we drive; this way, we can sit in our cars in the Sukkah." He also commented that "Perhaps realizing the fragility of the Sukkah will encourage us to drive more carefully.”

Clergy and staff
David H. Auerbach was the founding rabbi of the synagogue. He is from Montreal, Canada, and had served as rabbi of Ahavat Achim synagogue in Atlanta, Georgia, and then senior rabbi of Beth David Congregation in Miami prior to the founding of Bet Shira. Since his retirement in 2005, he served as the rabbi emeritus of the synagogue, until his passing in September 2016. In 2005, Rabbi Auerbach was followed as rabbi by Micah Caplan, until 2010.  In July 2010, Brian Schuldenfrei assumed the post of senior rabbi.  Schuldenfrei had been associate rabbi at Sinai Temple in Los Angeles, California.

Mark Kula, brother of Rabbi Irwin Kula, assumed the post of cantor in 1989. Mark and his father Morton Kula are the only father and son that have been ordained as cantors by the Jewish Theological Seminary of America in New York. Prior to coming to Miami, Mark was the assistant cantor of New York’s Park Avenue Synagogue. In 2013 Mark was appointed the Rabbi of the congregation and served as Rabbi until 2018.

In 2008, the synagogue appointed Renée Rittner as its education director.

in 2019, Ben Herman was hired as Bet Shira’s rabbi.

Religious school
The synagogue has an active religious school that serves students from pre-school through the Bar and Bat Mitzvah training.

Customs
The congregation is a conservative synagogue and is affiliated with the United Synagogue of Conservative Judaism.  As implied by its name (House of Song), Bet Shira values music and its incorporation into daily and ritual life. Although regular services are held in traditional style, without musical instruments, is a custom of the synagogue to conduct services throughout the year accompanied by musical instruments.

Anti-semitic attack
In February 1988, an improperly drawn swastika and anti-Semitic slogans and "Jesus Lives; You Can't Kill Him" and "Accept Hitler, Respect Christ" were plastered across the synagogue, and 30 windows were smashed. In response, a neighboring church put a Star of David on its lawn, and its parish donated $1,000 towards repairing the windows.  Miami Sunset High School students painted over the anti-Semitic slurs spray-painted by the vandals.  Four teenagers, three of whom were football players at Miami Palmetto High School, were sentenced for having vandalized the synagogue to 200 hours of community service and ordered to pay the $14,800 ($ today) in damages.

Two years later, on five occasions in six weeks vandals shot at windows at the synagogue.  Three teenagers, two of them students at Palmetto High School, were arrested for shooting out the windows.

References

External links
Official synagogue site
Facebook page

20th-century attacks on synagogues and Jewish communal organizations in the United States
Buildings and structures in Miami
Conservative synagogues in Florida
Crimes in Florida
Religion in Miami
Jewish organizations established in 1985
1985 establishments in Florida